Arfons is a commune of the Tarn department in southern France.

See also
Communes of the Tarn department

References

Communes of Tarn (department)